The Great Hall of the People is a state building located at the western edge of Tiananmen Square in Beijing. It is used for legislative and ceremonial activities by the government of the People's Republic of China (PRC) and the ruling Chinese Communist Party. The People's Great Hall functions as the meeting place for the full sessions of the National People's Congress (NPC), the Chinese legislature, which occurs every year during March along with the national session of the Chinese People's Political Consultative Conference (CPPCC), a political advisory body. It is also the meeting place of the National Congress of the Chinese Communist Party, which, since the 12th conference in 1982, has occurred once every five years and the party's Central Committee which meets approximately once a year.

The Hall is also used for many special events, including national level meetings of various social and political organizations, large anniversary celebrations, as well as the memorial services for former leaders. The Great Hall of the People is also a popular attraction in the city frequented by tourists visiting the capital.

History
The Great Hall of the People was opened in September 1959 as one of the "Ten Great Constructions" completed for the 10th Anniversary of the PRC. The decision to build the Hall was made by the politburo in August 1958. Zhou Enlai believed the final design should give the message that "the people are the masters of the country". After design proposals were submitted, a group of architects from across the country chose the winning design by Zhao Dongri and Shen Qi.  Zhang Bo was appointed as the chief architect. The construction took 10 months, 7,785 workers and was fashioned with military-like strategies that emulated the Great Leap Forward.

Description

Designed to symbolize the national unity and ethnic equality of the nation, the Great Hall embodied the new Chinese character of time in its features, proportion and details. The building covers 171,801 square metres (1,849,239 sq ft) of floor space, it is 356 metres in length and 206.5 metres in width. The centre's highest point reaches 46.5 metres. At the eaves of the main gate hangs the national emblem of the PRC.

The Great Hall of the People consists of three sections.
The central section principally includes the Great Auditorium, the Main Auditorium, the Congress Hall (Standing Committee of SCPCC meets in conference), the Central Hall, the Golden Hall and other main halls.
The northern section consists of the State Banquet Hall, the Salute State Guest Hall, the North Hall, the East Hall, the West Hall and other large halls.
The southern part is the office building of the Standing Committee of the People's Congress of China.
Among them, the central hall covers an area of 3,600 square meters. The retaining walls and floor are paved with colored marble. There are 20 white marble pillars around. There is a 12-meter-wide corridor on the middle floor. There are 6 main entrances leading to the Great Hall of Ten Thousands.

Each province, special administrative region, autonomous region of China has its own hall in the Great Hall, such as Beijing Hall, Hong Kong Hall and Hainan Hall. Each hall has the unique characteristics of the province and is furnished according to the local style.

Upon its completion, the Great Hall became China's largest auditorium which had previously been the Sun Yat-sen Auditorium. The Great Auditorium, with volume of 90,000 cubic metres, seats 3,693 in the lower floor, 3,515 in the balcony, 2,518 in the gallery and 300 to 500 on the dais. Government leaders make their speeches; and the representatives do much of their business.  It can simultaneously seat 10,000 representatives. The ceiling is decorated with a galaxy of lights, with a large red star is at the centre of the ceiling, and a pattern of a water waves nearby represents the people.  Its facilities equipped with audio-visual and other systems adaptable to a variety of meeting types and sizes. A simultaneous interpretation system is also provided with a language booth.

The State Banquet Hall with an area of 7,000 square meters can entertain 7,000 guests, and up to 5,000 people can dine at one time (as was done on the occasion of Richard Nixon's 1972 visit to China). Smaller gatherings can be held in the Main Auditorium, with larger groups having the use of one or more of the conference halls, such as Golden Hall and North Hall, and the smallest assemblies accommodated in one or more of the over 30 conference halls that are named after provinces and regions in China.

Usage

The Great Hall of the People is the political hub of Beijing and home of the National People's Congress. Every year, in March, the Great Hall of the People plays host to the liang hui (literally means "two meetings") event, where both the Chinese People's Political Consultative Conference (CPPCC) and the National People's Congress (NPC) meet in sessions lasting for two to three weeks at the Great Auditorium. The Chinese Communist Party (CCP) also holds its National Congress every five years in the Great Hall of the People.

The Great Hall has been used for meetings with foreign dignitaries on state or working visits, as well as large anniversary celebrations attended by top leaders.

The Great Hall has been used for the state funerals and memorial services for several top leaders. Former President Liu Shaoqi was purged during the Cultural Revolution and died in the ensuing struggles. He was posthumously rehabilitated after 1978. In 1982 Liu was granted a state funeral held at the Great Hall. The Great Hall also held the funerals of General Secretary Hu Yaobang in 1989 during the Tiananmen Square protests, as well as the state funerals for paramount leader Deng Xiaoping in 1997, and Jiang Zemin in 2022.

Mao Zedong's funeral ceremony was not held at the Great Hall; it was held at Tiananmen Square.

The building and its main "Great Auditorium" is open to the public as a tourist attraction when it is not in use. Some non-political conventions and concerts have also been held in the Great Hall.

In October 2003, Riverdance, the Irish music and dance entertainment phenomenon, was the first show from the West to perform in the Great Hall of the People, Beijing, with eleven sold-out performances. The Riverdance performances recorded a spontaneous reaction with standing ovations at each show which was uncharacteristic for a Chinese audience. Riverdance was officially invited to perform in the Great Hall of the People by former premier of the People's Republic of China, Zhu Rongji during his state visit to Ireland in September 2001.

In January 2009, American country music trio Lucy Angel became the first American group to be invited to perform at the Great Hall of the People, doing so before an audience of dignitaries and government officials.

See also
Politics of the People's Republic of China
State Kremlin Palace, Moscow
United States Capitol

References

External links

 The Great Hall – Official info (archived 10 January 2018)
 Satellite photo of the Great Hall of the People from Google Maps

Buildings and structures completed in 1959
Buildings and structures in Beijing
Government buildings in China
Legislative buildings
Seats of national legislatures
Tiananmen Square
Xicheng District
1959 establishments in China